
Teapot may refer to:

Teapots
Teapot, a vessel for brewing or serving tea
Brown Betty, a British type of teapot
Cube teapot, a British nautical teapot
Kyūsu, a Japanese type of teapot
Yixing clay teapot, a Chinese type of teapot
Tetsubin teapot, a Japanese pot for boiling water for tea

Astronomy
Sagittarius (constellation), sometimes called the Teapot

American politics
Teapot Dome scandal, a bribery scandal (1921-1923)
Teapot Rock or Teapot Dome, oilfield at the center of the scandal
TeaPot Party, an advocacy group formed by Willie Nelson

Philosophy
Russell's teapot (1952), a concept in philosophy

Computing
Utah teapot (1975), an iconic model used in early 3D computer graphics
I'm a teapot, a gag code (#418) in the HTML client errors status codes

Buildings and museums
Chester teapot, a teapot-shaped novelty building in West Virginia
Teapot Dome Service Station, a teapot-shaped novelty building in Washington State
Teapot Island, a teapot museum in Kent
Sihai Teapot Museum, a teapot museum in Shanghai
Sparta Teapot Museum, a teapot museum in North Carolina

Music, art, and literature
"The Teapot" (1863), a story by Hans Christian Andersen
"I'm a Little Teapot" (1939), an American popular song
Teapot Industries, an Italian indie rock band
Flying Teapot (album) (1973), an album by the international progressive rock band Gong
The Brass Teapot (2012), an American fantasy film

Other
Operation Teapot (1955), a series of nuclear tests
Teapot Committee, codename for the United States Air Force Strategic Missile Evaluation Committee (1953-1954)
"Flying Teapot", nickname for the Stanley Steamer, an early 20th century automobile
"Teapot cult", derogatory appellation for the Sky Kingdom Malaysian religious sect

See also
:Category:Teapots
Tea urn, a device for boiling water for tea
Samovar, a type of tea urn
Tempest in a teapot